Tak is a two-player abstract strategy game designed by James Ernest and Patrick Rothfuss and published by Cheapass Games in 2016. In Tak, players aim to connect two opposite edges of the board with pieces called "stones", and create a road. To accomplish this, players take turns placing their own stones and building a road while blocking and capturing their opponent's stones to hinder their efforts at the same. A player "captures" a stone by stacking one of their pieces on top of the opponent's. These stacks can then be moved as a whole or broken up and moved across several spaces on the board. The vertical stacking and unstacking of stones gives a three dimensional element to the game play. Upon its release, Tak received positive reviews.

Terminology 
There are several common terms used to describe different aspects of Tak and its states of play. Many of the terms are unofficial and, while proposed or commonly accepted among Tak players, are not published in official rules or used in other official capacities.

Roads
 Roads are lines of flat stones, or flat stones and capstones, that connect the north end of the board to the south end or the east end to the west end (or south/north, west/east). They do not have to be a straight line, but each stone must connect orthogonally (north, south, east, west) to the next stone in the road. There are no diagonal connections. The first player to complete a road wins the game.
Flat stones
 Often simply called "flats", these pieces lay flat on the board, may stack on top of each other, and count as part of a player's "road".
Standing stones
 Commonly called "walls", these are flat stones placed standing up on their narrowest side. Standing stones do not count as part of a player's road and are used to block another player's road. Standing stones can stack on top of flat stones and can be "flattened" or "crushed" by a "capstone." Flattening a standing stone turns it into a captive flat stone.
Capstones
 Capstones are the "power piece" of Tak. They have a unique appearance compared to the player's flat and standing stones, which are uniform in color and shape, can't be stacked on by an opponent, and count as a road for the owner. They also have the ability to "flatten" standing stones, turning them into flat stones, by moving onto the standing stone's square.
Stack
 Stacks are groups of stones of one or more color stacked on top of each other. They can consist of all flat stones of one or both colors, flat stones of one or both colors with a standing stone of either color on top, or flat stones of one or both colors with a capstone of either color on top. Stacks can move like a single stone one space in any orthogonal direction, or they can be split up and moved several spaces across the board so long as one or more stones from the bottom are left on the square they're moving past. Stacks can only be made by moving stones on top of each other, not through placement.
Tak
 "Tak" is called when the player is one move away from completing a road and winning the game, similar to the concept of "check" in chess . Calling Tak is optional, but is encouraged when playing against beginners or can be mandatory when agreed upon beforehand.
Tinuë
 Tinuë is an unofficial term for a winning position where the active player can complete a road on their next turn, regardless of what move the opponent makes. This is analogous to "mate in one" in chess. Tinuë is commonly a situation where a player can complete a road in several different ways with the opposing player only able to block one winning path.
Flat Win
 When either player places their last piece on the board, or if every square on the board is filled, the game ends. If there is no completed road at this time, the player who has the most flat stones on the board wins. Flats that are captives underneath a stack do not count towards the score in a flat win.
Hard cap
 Informal term for a capstone with a friendly flatstone underneath. There can be additional stones of any color underneath the "deputy stone" (the stone immediately underneath the capstone of the same color).
Soft Cap
 An informal term for a capstone with an opponent's flatstone directly beneath.

Momentum

 Momentum determines who has control of the game. For example, If a player makes a road threat, their opponent must respond or they will win. The player making the threat controls the board state, forcing the other player to respond and by doing so gains momentum.

Rules

Setup

Tak is played on a square gameboard of various sizes. Games can be played on the squares of the board or on the intersections and corners of the squares (similar to Go). In addition, there are specialized hybrid boards that provide a single surface for different sized games, such as the arcanist board that allows for 5x5 and 6x6 play. If there is no board available, players may use an object or a temporary marker to designate the center of the board, while making mental note of the board limits. The number of stones available to each player depends on the size of the board. The stone count for each size as set by the rules is listed below.

Similar to the conventions of chess, Tak game pieces, referred to as "stones", are divided into white and black sets. The players are often referred to as "White" and "Black." Tak sets, however, are available in a variety of colors and styles. Aesthetically, the capstone shape varies among different sets, while flat and standing stones are simple, stackable pieces

Opening Turn 
Players determine randomly who starts the first game, and alternate the first move for future games. In competitive play, white plays first.

All Tak games start with an empty board. On each player's first turn, they must place one of their opponent's flat stones on any empty space on the board. Play then proceeds normally with players controlling their own pieces.

Standard Turn
After the first turn, players must either place a stone on the board or move a stone or stack under their control. Passing is not allowed.

Placement 
On their turn, players may place one stone from their reserve onto an empty spot on the board. There are three stone types that can be placed:
 Flat stones are "normal" stones played "flat" face down on the board. Flat stones can be stacked upon by either player by moving their stones already on the board. Flat stones count as part of a road.
 Standing stones are "normal" stones played "standing" on their edge. Standing stones cannot be stacked upon except by a capstone, but they do not count as part of a road. Standing stones are also commonly called "walls".
 Capstones are the most powerful pieces, as they count towards a road and cannot be stacked upon by any piece. The capstone can also move onto a standing stone and flatten it into a flat stone. Both the opponent's standing stones and the player's standing stones can be flattened in this manner.

Movement 
A player may move a single piece or a stack of pieces they control. A stack is made when a player moves a stone on top of another flat stone of any color. The stone on top of a stack determines which player has control of that entire stack. All stones move orthogonally in a straight line on the board. There is no diagonal movement.

A player can also move a whole stack in addition to single stones. A stack can be moved like a single stone, moved in its entirety one space orthogonally (North, South, East, or West), or it can move several spaces orthogonally by breaking the stack and placing one or more flat stones onto the squares being moved onto. The player can leave any number of stones, including zero, on the starting space, but must place at least one piece for each subsequent move. There is no height limit for stacks, but the amount of stones a player can remove from the stack and move is set by the "carry limit" of the board. The carry limit of the board is determined by the dimensions of the board. For example, if the stack was on a 5x5 board, the carry limit of the stack would be five.

Because standing stones and capstones can't be stacked upon, there are no stacks with these pieces at the bottom or in the middle of the stack. Both of these stones however can be moved onto other flat stones to form a stack with them as the head. A capstone may "flatten" a standing stone and use it to form a stack with the capstone as its head, but it must do so alone. For example, a stack with a capstone cannot flatten a standing stone by moving as a stack onto the standing stone, but a stack can be used to move a capstone across the board so that the capstone alone moves to flatten the standing stone as the final movement.

Endgame conditions 
The primary goal of Tak is to build a road from any edge of the board to the opposite edge. This can be accomplished using flat stones or capstones. Standing stones do not count as part of a road. When a road is built, the owner of the road is declared the winner. This is called a "road win". Roads do not have to be in a straight line, but stones can only connect when they are orthogonally adjacent (North, South, East, West) to one another. Stones cannot connect diagonally.

If a player makes a move that results in a winning road for both players, the active player wins. This is called the Dragon clause, or a double road.

If a road has not been built by either player, and the board is either fully covered or one player has run out of stones, the game ends and the flat stones of each player are counted. The player with the most flats wins. This is called a "flat win." Standing stones and capstones do not count, nor do captive stones underneath a stack regardless of the owner.

If the flat count is equal when the game has gone to a flat decision a draw is declared.

Variants 
Players have proposed numerous variations to the official rules and have developed unofficial terminology to describe these variations and the different states of game play, including the variant of "komi".

Komi 
Several online competitive tournaments have incorporated the variant of "komi" which is an adaptation of Komi from the game of Go. In Tak, applying komi typically means a certain score is added to the second player's final flat count. The effect is that it permits the second player to place more standing stones (walls) during the game with the komi score offsetting some of the negative impact such plays have on that player's flat count. This is intended to give the second player an advantage to counterbalance the first player advantage. After a few years of players experimenting with komi in informal tournaments, the US Tak Association incorporated a komi of +2 for the 2021 U.S. Tak Open.

History 
Tak design is based on the fictional game of "tak" described in Patrick Rothfuss' 2011 fantasy novel The Wise Man's Fear. In 2014, Ernest worked with Patrick to design a game based on the concept. Initially, Patrick was reluctant of the design, but after Ernest showed him the gameplay, he approved of it and launched the Kickstarter.

Following this private unveiling of the game, Ernest and Rothfuss, with support from Cheapass Games, launched a Kickstarter campaign on 2016, which resulted in 12,000 backers contributing more than $1.35 million. Since then, the US Tak Association has been founded by fans of the game to promote the game's recognition and its level of play, and to host tournaments in person and online.

Reception 
In the Paste Magazine, Keith Law praised the simplicity and strategy despite criticising the theme, concluding that it was a "very clever little game". In Abstract Games magazine, Dr. Kerry Handscomb commented that Tak is "reminiscent of mancala" and "exactly the kind of game that ought to be an intellectual pastime in some world." Alisha Karabinus, in NYMGamer, found the game play to be accessible to both kids and adults, and praised its versality. Owen Duffy, in The Guardian, also noted the game's simple rules creating "genuine depth" and applauded the feel of the game as one "invented centuries ago and passed down over generations."

In 2021, Tak was incorporated as an event in the international Mind Sports Olympiad.

Community 
Tak has a small online community of players who play, discuss, and promote the game, including the US Tak Association and various other publications.

US Tak Association 
In 2016, Tak players founded the US Tak Association (USTA), a nonprofit organization dedicated to supporting and promoting the game of Tak in the United States and worldwide. USTA has two primary goals: to educate the public about the game of Tak, and to provide opportunities for fair and competitive play to its members. Players can pay to join and become a member of USTA. USTA hosts online tournaments and promotes Tak through tabletop game conventions such as Gen Con.

Online gameplay 
Tak is available to play for free online through Playtak.com, where players can play Tak against other human players or against NPC opponents.

Tak Times publication 
In late 2020, Tak players created the "Tak Times", an online publication of Tak community news and a monthly magazine-style "issue" of commentary, interviews, puzzles, and similar articles.

Strategy 
Many players discuss and propose ideas regarding Tak strategy through online communities, blogs, articles in the Tak Times and USTA Capstone Quarterly.

Tak strategy and its level of complexity was the topic of a study published through the Leiden Institute of Advanced Computer Science (LIACS) at Leiden University. The thesis concluded that a general strategy of playing flat stones instead of placing walls or moving stones led to more victories. Similarly, Viliam Vadocz, in his project implementing AlphaZero for Tak, has found that his bot quickly learned to heavily prefer placing a flat stone over other types of moves.

First player advantage 
Tak has a strong first player advantage on smaller boards. Bill Leighton, author of Mastering Tak Level 1: A Foundation for Success, estimated a bias of around 66% on the 5x5 board. For the 6x6 board, his estimate of first player advantage stands at 59% bias towards the first player. For comparison, the bias in chess is roughly 55% to 60% in favor of the first player at high-level play.

A notable example of an attempt to deal with first player bias in a tournament setting was the use of komi in the 2020 Covid-19 Cup. An automatic score of three points was added to Black's score in the event of a flat decision.

See also 
 Abstract Strategy Game
 Connection Games
 Emergo
 Hex
 Mancala

Notes

References

External links
 Playtak, a free, fanmade, browser-based Tak-playing site
 USTA – US Tak Association

Abstract strategy games
Cheapass Games games
Fictional games